= Sonia de Francisco =

Argentinian librarian, information professional and academic

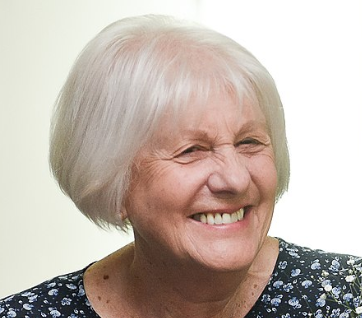
- Sonia de Francisco in a tribute to her person during the X Conference on Current Topics in Library Science, November 2019.
- Born: 1947/11/15; Argentina
- Occupation: Librarian
- Known for: Director of the Municipal Library System of the city of Mar del Plata from 1974 to 1991.

Sonia de Francisco (1947), is an Argentinian librarian president of the Mar del Plata Business Women organization (Mujeres Empresarias de Mar del Plata). She was the first person in charge of the municipal library division of Mar del Plata city, created in 1974. She promoted the opening of different libraries in Mar del Plata city through neighborhood development associations, municipal libraries that were installed in the city squares and the United Nations Depository Library. Between 2010 and 2012, was a volunteer for CONABIP's bookmobile campaign, "Sumergite en la Lectura" (Immerse yourself in Reading), highlighting the ludic space of reading. She has promoted important exchange experiences between Mar del Plata and Barcelona, driven forward the role of libraries as social enterprises.

== Career ==
In the 70's she created the Municipal Libraries Division within the framework of the Directorate of Culture of the Municipality of Mar del Plata. On September 29, 1978, she founded the Communal Public Library in Batán city (General Pueyrredón). In 2017 she presented the culmination of three years of work to create and strengthen the exchange between Mar del Plata (Argentina) and Barcelona (Spain) where she not only promoted the visibility of libraries in both cities, but also promoted the participation of women in the world business.

== Awards and other distinctions ==
- AIDA award, Mar del Plata, 1983.
- Mention "Personajes de mi Ciudad" (My Town Characters), from the J.M de Pueyrredón Cultural Center, Mar del Plata, September 1995.
- "Esperanza de Oro" (Gold´s Hope) award for her social effort, which allows us to glimpse her capacity for service and her committed soul against discrimination, Mar del Plata, October 1995.
- "Presidential Award of Excellence" prize, in appreciation of her tireless dedication and selfless service, Greater Fort Lauderdale Sister Cities International, Florida, November 2001.
- "Greater Fort Lauderdale Sister Cities International, Florida, November 2001" prize for her invaluable contribution to Argentina commemorating the Hispanic Heritage Month, Broward County Libraries Division, September 2002.
- Mention "Dama de la Solidaridad" (Lady of Solidarity), from the Social Welfare Fund for Lawyers of the Province of Buenos Aires, November 2004.
- "Actitud Emprendedora" (Entrepreneurial Attitude) prize from the CEPES Foundation, Mar del Plata in October 2009.
- Honorable mention from the saga of the 7 woman´s writers Belloso - Ferrari - Gondin - Larice - Ovejero - Slaiman - Vega, for promoting a literary project, Mar del Plata, International Women's Day, March 8, 2015.
- Tribute at the X Jornada Temas Actuales en Bibliotecología (Conference on Current Topics in Library Science),Mar del Plata, November 2019.
